Shalimar Works (1980) Ltd. is a public sector shipbuilding company of West Bengal, India. It owns a small shipyard on the right bank of the Hooghly River at Shibpur, Howrah. The origin of shipyard can be traced back to 1885.

Current activity and future plans
The shipyard is capable of manufacturing small-size ships and can also engage medium-size ship for repairing.  Its major work in the past involved repairing ships for the Kolkata Port Trust and fabricating vessels for the Tourism department and the Union Territory of Andaman and Nicobar Islands.

The orders included two 500 ton barges, three 50 Men ferries and three 200 ton barges. In June 2012, the shipyard delivered its first vessel built for the Indian Navy

As of 2012, the shipyard has capacity to process and repair 5 vessels at a time. It plans to implement a Rs 70 crore modernisation plan to develop warship building capacity and has sought the cooperation of the Calcutta Port Trust for expansion. The company is also planning to shift operations to Haldia.

Ships constructed
INS MANGAL
INS MANOHAR
INS KUMTA
INS UDUPI
INS MOHINI
INS NEELAM
INS URVASHI
INS PRODAYAK
INS Poshak (Shalimar)
Shalimar class ferry

See also

Peers
ABG Shipyard
Modest Infrastructure Ltd
Tebma Shipyard Limited
Bharati Shipyard Limited

References

External links

http://www.thehindu.com/todays-paper/tp-national/tp-otherstates/shalimar-works-to-build-small-warships/article4057088.ece

Shipbuilding companies of India
Shipyards of India
Companies based in West Bengal
1980 establishments in West Bengal
Indian companies established in 1980